Remeglurant (developmental code name MRZ-8456) is a drug which acts as a selective antagonist of the mGlu5 receptor. It is under development by Merz Pharmaceuticals for the treatment of drug-induced dyskinesia but no development has been reported since at least 2016.

See also
 Basimglurant
 Dipraglurant
 Fenobam
 Mavoglurant
 Raseglurant

References

Isoquinolines
MGlu5 receptor antagonists
Organobromides
Pyrimidines